The ruffe or Eurasian ruffe (Gymnocephalus cernuus) is a widespread freshwater fish in Eurasia and introduced to North America.

Ruffe may also refer to:
Any fish of the genus Gymnocephalus
New Zealand ruffe, Schedophilus huttoni
Tasmanian ruffe, Tubbia tasmanica
Sea ruffe, Any fish of the genus Sebastiscus